Elsava is a  right tributary of the Main in the administrative districts Aschaffenburg and Miltenberg in the Bavarian Spessart. It flows into the river Main in Elsenfeld.

Name 
The original name Elsapha is descended from the Old High German word Els for alder and the Indogermanic word Ap what meant water. As an explanation "watercourse surrounded by alders" arises from it. The river gave the municipality Elsenfeld the name. The river Aschaff flowing nearby (from Ascapha meaning "ash water") has also the same name origin.

See also

List of rivers of Bavaria

References

Rivers of Bavaria
Rivers of the Spessart
Rivers of Germany